Mitroshino is a rural locality (a village) in Golovinskoye Rural Settlement, Sudogodsky District, Vladimir Oblast, Russia. The population was 6 as of 2010.

Geography 
Mitroshino is located 28 km west of Sudogda (the district's administrative centre) by road. Inyutino is the nearest rural locality.

References 

Rural localities in Sudogodsky District